Kazi Zaker Husain (1 January 1931 – 21 June 2011) was a Bangladeshi zoologist. He was awarded Independence Day Award in 1992 by the Government of Bangladesh.

Career
Husain served as a faculty member of the Department of Zoology at the University of Dhaka since 1953. He went on to be the Dean of the Faculty of Biological Science.

Husain wrote three books including Birds of Bangladesh.

References

1930s births
2011 deaths
People from Comilla
Academic staff of the University of Dhaka
Recipients of the Independence Day Award
Burials at Banani Graveyard
Bangladeshi zoologists